Koghb is a village and rural community in the Noyemberyan Municipality of the Tavush Province of Armenia, located near the town of Noyemberyan.

Historical heritage 
Koghb has many religious heritage sites, including the Mshkavank Monastery located on a mountain 3–4 km southwest of the village, which contains a restored 5th-century St. Astvatsatsin Church, the 5th-6th-century Tsghakhach Church, the 6th-century Tvarageghtsi Church and a 12th-13th century cemetery. Northwest of Koghb are the ruins of the Surb Arakel shrine in the old Arakelots village.

There are also many forts in the vicinity of the village, including, the Berdategh cyclopean fort 1.5 km to the southeast, and the fort of Gharanots Gol close by. 10 km west of Koghb are two cyclopean forts, Zikurati and Kozmani, with Bronze Age tomb fields adjacent. 15 km west is the Patashar cyclopean fort.

Gallery

References

External links 

 Koghb Art School
 
 

Populated places in Tavush Province